Stewart Brett McKinney (January 30, 1931 – May 7, 1987) was an American politician who represented Connecticut's 4th congressional district in the House of Representatives from 1971 until his death in 1987. He is perhaps best known for coining the phrase “too big to fail” in regard to large American financial institutions, and his struggle with, and eventual death from, AIDS.

Early life
McKinney was born in Pittsburgh, Pennsylvania and raised in Connecticut. He attended Kent School and later Princeton University from 1949 to 1951, but dropped out and enlisted in the United States Air Force. He attained the rank of sergeant, and completed his enlistment in 1955.  McKinney then returned to college, and received a B.A. from Yale University in 1958.

He raced cars and was involved in several car-related businesses, including Auto Interior Decorators, Inc. and Fairfield Firestone, and was president of a chain of tire stores called CMF Tires. He also owned Lantern Point Real Estate Development and other ventures.

Political career
In 1966, McKinney was elected as a Republican to the Connecticut State House of Representatives, where he served two terms between 1967 and 1971. During his second term, he served as minority leader.

In 1970, McKinney ran for the U.S. House and won. He served in the House, as a moderate Republican, until his death in Washington, D.C. He is widely known for the McKinney-Vento Homeless Assistance Act of 1986, which provides federal money for shelter programs.  McKinney served on the Banking, Finance and Urban Affairs Committee,
 
and is credited with coining the phrase "too big to fail", in connection with large banks.  In Congress, he served on the House Select Committee on Assassinations. During this time, he also served as a director of Bridgeport Hospital.

Death and legacy
His death in 1987 was brought about by complications of AIDS. His physician speculated that McKinney became infected with HIV in 1979 as the result of blood transfusions during heart surgery.  McKinney was known by friends to be bisexual, though his family said this was not the case, which raised the issue of how he had contracted the disease. Anti-gay prejudice at the time of McKinney's death in 1987 may have promoted a disingenuous approach to speculations on the cause of McKinney's HIV infection.  Arnold Denson, the man with whom McKinney had been living in Washington, and to whom McKinney left property in his will, said that he had been McKinney's lover, and that he believed McKinney was already infected when Denson met him.

In 1987, Barney Frank became the first U.S. congressman to come out as gay of his own volition, and was inspired to do so in part by the death of McKinney; Frank told The Washington Post that after McKinney's death there was, "An unfortunate debate about 'Was he or wasn't he? Didn't he or did he?' I said to myself, I don't want that to happen to me."

After McKinney's death, Congress renamed the Salt Meadow National Wildlife Refuge in Connecticut the Stewart B. McKinney National Wildlife Refuge. Additionally, in 1988, Connecticut's legislature honored McKinney's legacy by naming the Stamford Transportation Center after him.

Family
McKinney married Lucie Cunningham, the daughter of Briggs Cunningham II and Lucie Bedford, the granddaughter of a co-founder of Standard Oil.  They had five children—Stewart Jr. (b. June 7, 1957), Lucie (b. June 8, 1958), Jean, Elizabeth (b. October 15, 1960), and John (b. March 6, 1964).

John McKinney was minority leader of the Connecticut State Senate until the end of 2014, and was an unsuccessful candidate for the Republican nomination for Governor in the 2014 elections.

See also
 List of members of the American Legion
 List of United States Congress members who died in office (1950–99)

References

External links

Wall Street Journal Obituary as republished by Ben Gardiner
Virtual AIDS Quilt Obituary

 

1931 births
1987 deaths
20th-century American politicians
AIDS-related deaths in Washington, D.C.
American athlete-politicians
American LGBT military personnel
American sportsmen
Bisexual men
Bisexual politicians
Bisexual sportspeople
Deaths from pneumonia in Washington, D.C.
Kent School alumni
LGBT members of the United States Congress
LGBT people from Pennsylvania
LGBT racing drivers
American LGBT sportspeople
LGBT state legislators in Connecticut
Republican Party members of the Connecticut House of Representatives
Politicians from Pittsburgh
Princeton University alumni
Racing drivers from Connecticut
Republican Party members of the United States House of Representatives from Connecticut
United States Air Force non-commissioned officers
Yale University alumni
Bisexual military personnel
20th-century American LGBT people